The 1992 United States presidential election in Maryland took place on November 3, 1992, as part of the 1992 United States presidential election. Voters chose 10 representatives, or electors to the Electoral College, who voted for president and vice president.

Maryland was won by Governor Bill Clinton (D-Arkansas) with 49.80% of the popular vote over incumbent President George H. W. Bush (R-Texas) with 35.62%. Businessman Ross Perot (I-Texas) finished in third, with 14.18% of the popular vote. Clinton ultimately won the national vote, defeating incumbent President Bush.

Although Clinton won only five of Maryland's 24 counties, among the counties he won were the four most populous ones as well as the sixth most populous county, resulting in the Democratic candidate winning by a relatively large plurality. Maryland was of only three states, along with Washington DC, where if Bush’s and Perot’s vote had been combined, Clinton would still come out on top (albeit by an extremely slim margin of 63 votes). The other two states are New York and Arkansas. This is also the most recent election when the Democratic candidate failed to win a majority of the state's popular vote too. 

This marks the last election as of 2020 in which both Charles County and Dorchester County voted for the same candidate. In 1996, Dorchester County would be flipped to the Democratic column by a plurality for the first time since 1960 and vote for every ensuing Republican, while Charles County would become one of only two counties in the entire nation to flip from supporting Bob Dole to support Al Gore and never vote Republican again.

Results

Results by county

Counties that flipped from Republican to Democratic
Baltimore (County)
Howard

See also
 United States presidential elections in Maryland
 1992 United States presidential election
 1992 United States elections

Notes

References 

Maryland
1992
Presidential